Lake Harding is a lake in Meeker County, in the U.S. state of Minnesota.

Lake Harding was named for W. C. Harding, a local reverend.

See also
List of lakes in Minnesota

References

Lakes of Minnesota
Lakes of Meeker County, Minnesota